Podolaspis is an extinct genus of pteraspidid heterostracan agnathan which existed during the early Devonian period. It was originally described by Zych in 1931, and contains the species P. lerichei, and P. danieli.

References

External links
 Podolaspis at the Paleobiology Database

Pteraspidiformes genera
Devonian jawless fish
Prehistoric life of Europe